Round Hill is a mountain in Greene County, New York. It is located in the Catskill Mountains west-southwest of Maplecrest. Van Loan Hill is located east, and East Jewett Range is located south of Round Hill.

References

Mountains of Greene County, New York
Mountains of New York (state)